Major (stylized as MAJOR) is a Japanese sports manga series written and illustrated by Takuya Mitsuda. It was serialized in Shogakukan's shōnen manga magazine Weekly Shōnen Sunday from August 1994 to July 2010, with its chapters collected in 78 tankōbon volumes. It was followed by a sequel titled Major 2nd, which started in Weekly Shōnen Sunday in March 2015.

It was adapted into a 154-episode anime television series by Studio Hibari and later by SynergySP, titled Major. It ran for six seasons on NHK E from November 2004 to September 2010. Two original video animations (OVAs) were released in December 2011 and January 2012.

In 1996, Major received the Shogakukan Manga Award for the shōnen category. As of February 2018, the manga had over 54 million copies in circulation, making it one of the best-selling manga series.

Plot
The story of Major follows the life of Gorō Honda from kindergarten to his career as a professional baseball player. The story focuses on how the main protagonist overcomes tremendous challenges. Subsections are divided according to the official website's story sections.

Kindergarten ~ First grade
Gorō's father, Shigeharu Honda, is a baseball pitcher bouncing between the major and minor league teams of the NPB. Nonetheless, Gorō looks up to his father and wishes to be a professional baseball player just like him. Gorō's mother, Chiaki Honda, died from an unknown disease two years before the events of the story. Aside from his father, Gorō is very close to two other people: Momoko Hoshino and Toshiya Sato. Momoko is Gorō's kindergarten teacher and watches out for Gorō, as there are no other children of Gorō's age in the class. Toshiya is another child from Gorō's neighborhood, the only one of Gorō's age, and to whom Gorō taught baseball.

The father and son are struck a cruel blow when an arm injury prevents Honda from continuing his baseball career as a pitcher. Gorō is especially shaken by the fact that his father cannot pursue his career as a baseball player. For Honda, Gorō and baseball are all he has left in his life. For his son's sake, Honda takes his best friend's advice, revives his batting instincts, and successfully transforms into a slugger. Amidst these struggles, Momoko is drawn deeper and deeper into the family's life. Eventually, Honda proposes to Momoko.

Right when Honda establishes himself in a major league team, the Yokohama Marine Stars, the Tokyo Giants sign a contract with the American MLB player Joe Gibson, famous for his huge physical build and hard fastballs. When the Marine Stars with Honda and the Giants with Gibson finally meet on the field, Gibson strikes out every single Marine Stars batter, except for Honda. At his second at-bat, Honda hits a home run off Gibson's  pitch. After Honda's home run, the Marine Stars coach launches a series of bunt attacks, scoring additional runs, and psychologically shaking up Gibson who considers the tactic unsportsmanlike. By Honda's third at-bat, Gibson has completely lost his mental focus, and accidentally pitches a  dead ball that strikes Honda's head. The umpire immediately calls Gibson off the mound, though Honda quickly gets back onto his feet and continues with the game. Honda's excellent play makes him the headline of major newspapers. The next morning, Honda dies due to internal bleeding in his skull, leaving his heartbroken son and fiancé in mourning.

Little League
Three years have passed since Momoko adopted Gorō as her son upon Honda's death. When Gorō reaches fourth grade, he is finally old enough to join the local little league team, the Mifune Dolphins. However, the local kids are mostly interested in soccer, and Gorō has to get his new school friends to join him to have enough members to keep the baseball team from being dismantled.

Gorō shows himself to be an exceptionally gifted baseball player. The team coach recommends that Gorō join the nearby Yokohama Little team instead, which has better players, coaching, and resources. When Gorō visits the team, he discovers that not only is his childhood friend Toshiya at Yokohama Little, but his father, Shigeharu Honda, was a member of the Yokohama Little team with the current coach when they were younger. Gorō finds himself torn; following in his father's footsteps would mean abandoning the friends he asked to join the Mifune Dolphins. Gorō has a big fight with Momoko over the issue, and Momoko seeks advice from Hideki Shigeno, Honda's old friend and teammate. While meeting with Shigeno, Momoko coughs up blood and is hospitalized. While it turns out to just be a gastric ulcer, it makes Gorō realize that the living people in his life are much more important than the dead ones.

Meanwhile, Joe Gibson has just returned to the MLB after pitching in Japan for three years. He offers Gorō an all-expenses-paid invitation to travel to America and watch the MLB All-Star game, where Gibson will be the starting pitcher for the National League. At the game, not a single of the AL's top players can touch Gibson's pitches, and Gibson earns a standing ovation from the audience. Gibson explains that this was his way to show Gorō how great a slugger Honda had been since Honda had hit a home run off Gibson's best pitch. After the game, Gibson offers to allow Gorō to throw a ball at him. Gorō responds that he will postpone this "punishment" until the day he can pitch as well as Gibson.

Back in Japan, with renewed determination, Gorō leads the Mifune Dolphins through various trials and practice matches to defeat Yokohama Little, the best team in the region. In the end, the Dolphins do defeat Yokohama Little, but Gorō is injured in the process, making him unable to play for a few months. At the end of the season, Gorō's adoptive mother marries Hideki Shigeno, and the new family plans to move to Fukuoka after Shigeno is traded from the Marine Stars. Gorō, unable to face his teammates, leaves without saying goodbye, leaving them heartbroken.

Junior High
Gorō moves back to Mifune when his stepfather is traded back to the Blue Oceans. Gorō finds his little league friends grown up and attending Mifune East Junior High School. Gorō surprises his friends when he tells them that he has been playing soccer and doesn't plan on playing for the junior high baseball team due to a shoulder injury he sustained in Fukuoka. Gorō reveals to his friends that he has switched to being a southpaw pitcher. At first, Gorō is not interested in playing baseball because he wants to play with hard balls, not the rubber ones used in the junior high league.

During a match where Mifune East Junior High faces Mifune West Junior High, Gorō takes to the mound after seeing Mifune West insult his friends. In the game, Gorō's team manages a comeback victory. Together, Gorō and his friend Komori Daisuke rebuild the junior high baseball team. Eventually, they enter the regional junior high tournament, where Gorō once again finds himself playing against his friend and rival Toshiya Sato, who plays on the Tomonoura Junior High School team. Mifune eventually beats Tomonoura in a close game.

Gorō's friendship with Toshiya goes downhill when Toshiya decides to go to Kaido High School, where Gorō has no desire to go. A Kaido scout urges Gorō to enter Kaido, but Gorō refuses the offer, saying "as long as Toshiya goes to Kaido, I won't enter Kaido." The scout tells Toshiya to quit applying for Kaido, as they want Gorō instead. Gorō and Toshiya make a bet: their two teams will play against each other, and the winner will attend Kaido. Mifune East wins, but Toshiya and Gorō decide to take on Kaido together.

After a tournament defeat against Kaido Junior High, Gorō prepares to attend Kaido High to improve his pitching. Gorō, Komori, and Toshiya try out for the baseball team of the prestigious private high school. Komori is disqualified forced to attend Mifune High instead. Gorō and Toshiya make it through the first round of tryouts. Gorō then succeeds at an academic examination designed to test his determination.

Kaido High School
Immediately after they graduate middle school, Gorō and Toshiya are sent to Dream Island, where they undergo six months of hard training and make some new friends. Gorō then proceeds to the Atsugi campus, where he defeats a scholarship team. Gorō and Toshiya make the junior varsity team and spend a year and a half together as teammates. However, in their second year, Gorō reveals that his sincere desire is to challenge the excellent players of Kaido instead of playing on the same team as them. Toshiya is hurt by Gorō's decision but respects him for it. Gorō leads the junior varsity team to victory in a scrimmage against the varsity team and then quits Kaido High School to play for another team.

Seishu High School
Gorō has returned home after quitting Kaido. On arrival, his mother voices her dissatisfaction with the fact that he did not consult with her about his departure. She insists that Gorō be accountable for his actions and accept the responsibility to pay the application fee at any school that he chooses to enroll. Gorō's enrollment is rejected by several schools due to the Kaido assistant coach, Egashira, threatening to sue other schools for accepting him. Gorō is finally able to avoid Egashira's interference by enrolling at Seishuu High School. A girls-only school until just two years prior, Seishuu does not have a baseball team. Gorō enrolls, determined to create a baseball team from scratch. After he has enough committed players, Gorō and the team enter the summer tournament. First, Gorō and his new teammates play an exhibition match with the second-string players from Kaido. In the game, Gorō's foot gets injured when a rival player steps on it in a supposed accident. Despite the injury, Gorō and his team persist in the summer tournament and manage to reach the quarterfinals against Kaido. After a close game that goes into extra innings, Kaido wins and moves on to Koshien, while Gorō collapses from exhaustion.

Minor League Baseball
Despite losing the match against Kaido, Gorō attracted the eyes of many scouts during his time with the Seishuu High School team, including some from the Yokohama Marine Stars and the Tokyo Warriors. However, upon learning that Joe Gibson is still pitching in the MLB and has dedicated his 300-win season to his "young friend in Japan," Gorō loses interest in Japanese professional baseball and leaves for America to try out for the MLB. Meanwhile, Sato is recruited by the Tokyo Warriors, while Mayumura is hired by the Yokohama Marine Stars.

Gorō's  fastball, while ineffective against Major League sluggers, allows him to start in Triple-A instead of the rookie league. At first, he joins the Cougars but is soon released after a fight with Joe Gibson Jr. from the Oklahoma Falcons. Eventually, Gorō joins the Memphis Bats.

In Triple-A, Gorō finds a new rival: Joe Gibson Jr, son of Joe Gibson and an outstanding slugger. Junior views the death of Gorō's father as the cause of a tragedy that occurred on his own family, and he challenges Gorō to a bet: If Junior can hit a home run off Gorō, Gorō is to return to Japan and never set foot on American soil again. On the other hand, if Gorō can strike out Junior, then Junior will visit Gorō's father's grave and apologize for his insults. Gorō manages to strike out Junior with his increasingly deadly fastball.

The Bats go on to win the Triple-A playoffs.

Baseball World Cup

After the baseball season is over, Gorō returns to Japan. Shimizu finally admits her feelings for Gorō, and they became a couple. Meanwhile, Gorō learns from Toshi that there is going to be a Baseball World Cup the following year hosted in America, and for the first time, Major League players will be allowed to compete in it. Due to Gorō's impressive performance in the practice match between Rookies and the All-Star Japan team, he is selected as a replacement pitcher starting the second round of preliminaries. Gorō pitches as the closer against Venezuela and South Korea, earning a win and a save, respectively. Then, Mayumura earns a win pitching as closer against the Dominican Republic, advancing Japan to the semi-finals.

Shimizu comes to America to cheer Gorō on and encounters Toshiya's younger sister, Miho Sato. The day before the semi-finals match against Cuba, Toshiya runs into his sister, and the traumatic memories of being abandoned by his parents seven years prior are rekindled. Toshiya's body goes into involuntary shock, and he is hospitalized. Miho feels guilty about the incident, but Toshiya calls her and asks her to watch the next game. Toshiya makes several excellent plays against Cuba's aggressive offense in the semi-finals, and Gorō gets the win as the closer.

After the Cuba game, Gibson Jr. reveals to the Team USA's manager, as well as to Gorō, that his father, Joe Gibson, has angina pectoris. Junior hopes that the manager and Gorō might be able to dissuade Gibson from getting on the mound and potentially killing himself. However, with the players mostly in an "exhibition game" mentality, Gibson takes the mound in the 8th inning of the USA vs. Venezuela semi-finals, risking his life to raise the spirits of his teammates.

The following day, Gibson collapses during a practice session, and Gorō rushes to the hospital to see him. Gibson reveals to Gorō that, in a chance meeting with Momoko 10 years prior, he asked her why she had not accepted any monetary compensation from him. Momoko simply asks Gibson to remain a top-class baseball player until Gorō grows up so that Gorō can be proud of having a father who hit a home run off of such a great pitcher. Momoko's words were the pillar that supported and drove Gibson all these years. He felt that if he did not play in the Baseball World Cup and face Gorō on the mound, he would have failed Gorō and Momoko. Gorō comforts Gibson, telling him that he has done enough, and urging him to watch Gorō and Junior's showdown on TV.

The Japan vs. USA finals game begins with Japan taking a five-run lead, prompting Gibson to leave the hospital and go to the stadium to cheer his teammates on. Japan sends out Gorō in the 8th inning to protect their 1-run lead, but Junior hits a home run off Gorō's  fastball. The game goes into extra innings. Gorō and Junior keep up consecutive no-hit innings until the 15th inning, in which Toshiya's bat breaks during an at-bat. The bat's flying shrapnel hits Gibson in the heart. Gibson catches the ball and uses his remaining strength to throw out a runner. He collapses soon after.

Gorō, determined to strike out Gibson Jr, pitches the fastest pitch of his life: a  fastball. However, Junior hits a home-run off the pitch, sealing the World Championship for the USA team.

After the finals, Gorō loses his desire to play baseball and returns to Japan instead of going to Florida for spring training. But upon seeing his old teammates play in Japan, Gorō rekindles his desire to play and leaves to join the Hornets in Florida.

Major League Baseball
As the new MLB season begins, Gorō performs exceptionally well for the Hornets in exhibition matches. In his first official MLB game, he pitches a no-hit no-run game up until the 8th inning, when he suddenly loses his control. In his second game, his pitches start to go wild in the 5th inning. Suspecting "yips," the team's catcher, Keene, stops Gorō from voluntarily stepping off the mound, gambling on the chance that Gorō will overcome his struggles. Gorō throws at the batter's head and is ejected by the umpire. In his third game, Gorō is unable to retire a single batter. He is removed from the game in the first inning and sent back to the Triple-A Bats to improve his play.

Believing that Gorō's defeat at the hands of Gibson Jr. was the cause of his yips, the Hornets send Gorō to Billy Oliver, a sports psychologist, for treatment. After Gorō recovers from his yips, he feels aimless, leading to performance struggles.

Later, Gibson retires after a defeat at the hands of Gorō and the Hornets. Gibson's departure from baseball is treated as voluntary retirement, but in reality, Gibson takes the opportunity to start from scratch. He signs a minor league contract with Double-A Bulls. Gibson fights his way back up to the majors and waits for Gorō to rechallenge him.

Ultimately, the Hornets lose to the Salmons, ending their World Series chances. Gorō heads back to Japan to take a rest and solidify his relationship with Shimizu. A flash-forward eight years shows Gorō being brought out to close the last game of the World Series, where the Hornets face off against the Raiders. During the match, Shimizu is shown giving birth to her and Gorō's first child. The ending finds Gibson Jr. against Gorō in one final face-off.

Return to Japan
Following the events of Season 6, the Major OVA finds Gorō, after a splendid fourteen-year career, forced to retire from the Hornets. He can no longer pitch due to a shoulder injury despite surgery and rehabilitation. He rejects some offers of coaching positions and decides to return to Japan to continue playing baseball as a hitter and fielder. Before leaving, Gorō promises Toshi he will meet him again on the field as a batting opponent in the Major League, and Sato pledges to wait for Gorō. Gorō takes two years to train himself as a fielder and a hitter. Afterward, he joins the Blue Oceans and returns to being a professional player, inspiring his daughter and his son as his father had inspired him.

Characters

Main
 / 

A talented baseball player by the age of 5. His love of the game stems from his father, who played for the Yokohama Marine Stars. Gorō's mother died when he was three, leaving him with nothing but baseball and his father. Wanting nothing more than to follow in his father's footsteps, Gorō strives to become a professional ballplayer. Gorō also believes that the only way to make his father happy is to become a professional baseball player himself. He thrives on challenges and leverages his competitive mindset as he practices. He makes friends quickly, as people are drawn to his personality and his love of the game.
Tragedy again strikes Gorō at the age of 6, when he loses his father in a horrible accident in a game against MLB pitcher Joe Gibson. From then on, Gorō aims to join the MLB and someday challenge Gibson. He is taken in by Momoko, his kindergarten teacher, and his late father's lover. After Momoko gets married, Gorō's name is changed to Shigeno Gorō.

Shigeharu is an up-and-coming baseball pitcher for the Marine Stars. He is a widower and lives with his son, Gorō. An elbow injury threatens to end his baseball career early on until his friend and teammate, Shigeno, suggests that he try hitting. He develops feelings for Gorō's kindergarten teacher and nearly marries her. However, he tragically dies after being struck in the head by a pitch from Joe Gibson, an American pitcher who came to Japan from the MLB. During his childhood years, he played for the Yokohama Little league, and later Koshien high school alongside Shigeno.

Chiaki Honda was the deceased wife of Shigeharu Honda.
 / 

Momoko was Gorō's nursery school teacher when he was younger. After Gorō left nursery school, she dated his dad Shigeharu and was engaged to him at the time of his death. She adopted Gorō and raises him as a single parent until she marries Hideki Shigeno several years later. Her name changes to Momoko Shigeno. She then has children of her own, a boy named Shingo and a girl named Chiharu.

Hideki was an ace pitcher for the Yokohama Marine Stars. He and Shigeharu were buddies since high school, and Shigeno had been an irreplaceable friend to the Honda's. When Shigeharu was down due to his arm injury, Hideki sparked the thought for him to transform into a slugger instead. When Shigeharu died, he became reacquainted with Momoko and Goro (they last met at Honda's funeral), giving baseball-related advice to Goro. Then in early Spring three years later, he married Momoko and adopted Goro as his son. Around 1996, his son Shingo was born. In 1996 the Yokohama Marine Stars traded him to the Fukuoka Eagles (Hawks in the Movie). Then in 2000, the Yokohama got him back. However, following a period of bad performances, Shigeno announced his retirement after that season. For the remainder of the season, Shigeno's performance picked up again. His back number, #17, retired with him. (in the anime, the bad performances and retirement occurred during the 2002 season instead) After retiring from professional baseball, he became a sports commentator. In 2001, his daughter Chiharu was born. In 2005, Shigeno was recruited as the head coach as well as the pitcher coach of the Japan National Team for the Baseball World Cup.

Initially, Sato was a boy who was forced by his mother to focus on his studies to become a responsible adult. While Gorō was playing catch by himself one time, he saw Toshi staring from his window. At first, Toshi did not want to play catch with Gorō, but Gorō went to Toshi's house and convinced Toshi to play with him. He develops a love of the game equal to Gorō and becomes a talented catcher. Told by his mother that if he wanted to play baseball, he had to play for the best team, Toshiya went to play as a catcher for Yokohama Little League, which is the area's best team. Gorō runs into him again (Gorō moved away after his father's fiancée adopted him), and the two begin a rivalry as intense as their friendship. He plays against Gorō on Yokohama Little and again as the catcher of Tomonoura Junior High School's team. In between the time, Toshiya's family abandoned him due to debt problems, and he began living with his grandparents. Swearing to go pro so he could one day repay the debt he has from his grandparents. In the Junior years, Toshi wanted to get into Kaido High because he believed that was the best path to turn pro. He was later told by the Kaido scouts to give up so Gorō would join. Though Toshi had misunderstood Gorō's idea and thought Gorō did not want to play baseball with him. After the defeat to Mifune East, Toshi regained his confidence in Gorō and wished that they would go to the same high school together and defeat Kaido. Later Gorō told Toshi to go to Kaido with him to improve their skills. They try out for Kaido High School's baseball team together with Komori and become teammates on Kaido's Junior Varsity team for a year and a half.
During his years in Kaido, Toshi had lost contact with Gorō after his departure from Kaido. And when Gorō finally meets Toshi again, Toshi had completely forgotten of Gorō's team thinking they were only just surviving in the tournament. During the match against Seishu, Toshi was confident in defeating Gorō's team, though he was amazed by Gorō pitching he was injured. Toshiya went on a fantastic winning in the Koshien Tournament. Forming a battery with Mayumura and was Kaido's fourth batter. After high school, he had been scouted by the Tokyo Warriors team and won the Best New Player award. During the Baseball World Cup, he first joined Team Japan as DH, but later took on the catcher mask. At first, he had some trouble during the first match, though with Gorō's help, Toshi's confidence slowly increased.

Kaoru is in Gorō's class in elementary school and eventually begins to play little league baseball on the Mifune Dolphins Little League after an argument with Gorō where she sees his passion for the game. She was also the first person Gorō recruited to the Mifune Dolphins. In the finals against Yokohama, she was the catcher to replace the injured Komori. Already in elementary school, she began to have feelings for Gorō. In Junior High School, she switches to softball and becomes captain of the Mifune East Junior High team. Seeming, she still had a grudge against baseball because Gorō introduced it to her. Initially, she plans to follow Gorō, whom she has a crush on, to Kaido High School. However, she changes her mind after she discovers Kaido does not have a softball team and after Gorō tells her to follow her love of softball. She attended Seishu High School, the one Gorō later attends. She told her little brother Taiga to join Seishu's baseball club, seeming the great "baseball fanatic" was there. After high school, she attended Kyowa University. During the winter break of her freshman year, Gorō confesses to Kaoru, and they are going out. If Gorō was suggested as a baseball fanatic, Shimizu was said to be a softball fanatic. And now, she is shown that she is married to Gorō and has two children.

Joe Gibson is the man responsible for the death of Gorō's birth father. The incident remained a heavy cross weighed upon him, driving him to remain one of the top pitchers in the MLB so that Honda, by comparison, would be seen as an even more significant player. Due to this incident, he began to have family problems as his family did not fit in Japan. His son Joe Gibson Jr. started to have a grudge against him as his son believed Gibson and Honda Shigeharu created the reason for the family breakdown. He later returned to America after the death of his wife and daughter. He continued pitching after the age of 40 and earning over 300 wins. He stated he was waiting for a Japanese boy to join the Major League to challenge him. For the Baseball World Cup, he was Team USA's ace pitcher, although at that time, he was diagnosed with angina pectoris, and the doctor warned he might die if he continues pitching. However, Gibson may feel that dying on the mound pitching his best would be the only way to truly make up to Gorō, Momoko, and the deceased Honda. His surgery was successful. Gibson also stated, "I too once had a great rival, though he is now dead because of me."

Supporting

Komori was Honda's catcher since his earlier days as a little leaguer back when they were in Mifune Dolphins along with Sawamura and Shimizu. At first, he was being bullied by Sawamura but was helped by Gorō and solved the problem. He continued to catch for Gorō when he returned from Fukuoka in Mifune East Middle School but ended when Mayumura eliminated them single-handedly in their game with Kaido Affiliate. In season 3, when Gorō left Kaido and entered Seishuu, they become rivals where Gorō eventually won. After High school, Komori went on to play for his Uni as their pinch hitter. After high school, Komori went on to have a regular job and became the coach of the Mifune Dolphins. Goro's daughter joins the team with Komori as the coach during OVA 1.

Kaoru's brother. First seen back in season 1, where he asked his sister if baseball was fun, he returned in season 3 as a new member of the Seishuu Baseball Team, where he played as a shortstop. With his excellent skill and speed, he helped Gorō in challenging Kaido. Besides that, he also helped to take over the mound when Egashira injured gorō during their practice game with Kaido. He was a smartmouth kid who believed in defeat but later changed his opinion after watching Gorō time and time again pitching with an injured foot. Later on, he became the captain of the Seishuu Baseball Team to challenge Kaido once again with his new teammates. Declaring their goal is to win at Koshien. Though at first, he did not have the confidence and decided to learn to throw the gyroball so he could give new members the belief of going to Koshien. Though later, Gorō told him that he should make a team that suited him rather than follow in Gorō's footsteps. He is the 1st batter (batting left-handed) and plays shortstop.

Initially, Ryota is a bully in elementary school, pushing Komori. Gorō and Shimizu stand up to him, and he eventually backs down after Gorō hits him for trying to throw his baseball glove into the river. He soon realizes that he doesn't have any real friends and asks Gorō if he can play baseball with him, Shimizu and Komori. He started off playing soccer but changes to baseball so he could play in Little League with Gorō and the others. In junior high, he went back to soccer and was the captain of the team. In season 6, we learn that he injured his knee and could not continue playing. He remains friends with Komori, Shimizu, and Gorō.

Introduced in the Junior High story arc, Yoshitaka Yamane is on the Mifune Junior High School team but uses it to cut class with some other friends that follow him. He and his friends beat up Komori after he tells them that they have to quit if they aren't going to contribute to the team and frightened the remaining players into quitting, too. When Gorō returns and confronts him, Yamane reveals that he hates baseball because he cannot play it anymore. He was injured the year before and cannot throw the ball with his right arm. Gorō, who suffered a similar injury, teaches Yamane to throw left-handed, and he rejoins the team, playing first base. He goes on to Mifune High School with Komori, where he became the pitcher.

The son of Joe Gibson, Junior, is of the same age as Gorō. When Junior's parents divorced because his mother could not stand life in Japan, whereas Gibson wanted to remain in Japan pitching until he had found out how to make up for killing Honda, Junior stayed with his father in Japan. When his mother and sister died in a traffic accident in America, Junior became resentful towards his father and the deceased Honda. His motivation to play baseball was fueled by the desire to defeat his father. He is an extremely talented batter, being able to switch hit. He played for the AAA Oklahoma Falcons, the MLB team Texas Raiders, as well as the USA Team during the Baseball World Cup. He hit the walk-off home run against Gorō 103 mph pitch to lead the USA to the world cup victory. He plays third base.
Ken Mayumura

Introduced in season 2, he has a forward attitude. His personality is straightforward and to the point, often coming off as cold. He appears to be in complete control of his emotions at all times, including when facing established and more experienced players. Others see his pre-game ritual of sitting in a bathroom stall while listening to music as getting him in the right frame of mind to pitch, but in actuality, he does it because he is anxious and helps him focus his anxiety. Mayumura's pitch was as fast as Goro's and is also a gyroballer just like Shigeno. His goals are to achieve all possible individual achievements in Japanese Baseball before moving onto the Majors. In the anime, he plays for NPB's Yokohama Blue Oceans[Anime]/Orix BlueWave [Manga] as a starting pitcher. Still, at the end of season 6 and in OVA 2:World Series, it is shown that Mayumura becomes the ace pitcher for the Texas Raiders and forms a battery with Jeff Keene.
Tashiro

Fujii

Others
Jeff Keene
Jeff Keene is the catcher for both Indiana Hornets and Memphis Bats, he seems to be quiet almost all the time and doesn't like "chit-chatting." He is always serious and is a catcher and batter. In OVA 2:World Tail, it was shown that Ken and Keene are forming a battery.
Coach Ando
Coach Ando is a coach for the long-running little league baseball team "Mifune Dolphins," a team Goro and his friends (Komori, Kaoru, Sawamura, and the others) used to be teammates in their childhood.
Billy Oliver
Billy Oliver is a sports psychiatrist and a friend of Joe Gibson. In season 6, the Indiana Hornets sent Goro Shigeno to Billy Oliver to cure his yips, although it was said that it's not possible to cure his yips with just medicine. Later in the anime, it was shown that Goro had finally conquered his yips. Billy Oliver is also known as "Dr. Oliver."
Chiharu Shigeno
Voiced by:Tomoko Kaneda
Chiharu is Goro's little sister and daughter of Momoko and Hideki Shigeno.
Shingo Shigeno
Shingo is Goro's little brother and son of Momoko and Hideki Shigeno.
Hayato Yaginuma
Hayato Yaginuma was a Japanese baseball player that Goro first met in America when he was hitchhiking. Ginumachi and Goro, together, joined in a tryout to be Minor League players, later during the audition, they battle against the Salmons, and their task is to get back the Salmons' 10 runs. Although Goro and his friends (including Yaginuma) lost, they were accepted to be Minor League players, but Goro was allowed to join the Salmons and met Sanchez, a pitcher with great controls over his ball;Bolton, a batter who hit Goro's pitch during a test;and Fox, a catcher (and/or batter) which Goro befriended. Ginumachi, later in the anime, went back to Japan but returned in America to watch Goro's Memphis Bats team battling against Joe Gibson Junior's Oklahoma Falcons.
Miho Sato
Miho Sato is Toshiya's younger sister. In the older episodes, Miho, while she was still at her young age, and her parents left Toshi without him knowing it. Later in the anime, Kaoru met Miho in a restaurant when they bumped each other, but they became friends, Miho used a fake name "Waka," but Kaoru soon discovered her real name.
Ayane
Ayane is a character introduced in the second season of the Major anime after the time fast-forward. She is first seen when Goro is running past her, and she is nearby the game. Her friend initially expresses interest in becoming the manager of the baseball club because she has a crush on the captain. Ayane is bumped by someone on the stairs and is falling backward, but the captain catches her. She seems to have developed a crush in response to this and asks her friend if more than one person can be a manager. After noticing her glowing look, Ayane's friend declares that she will back off and instead support Ayane's love.
Megumi Koga
Megumi Koga (Japanese order Koga Megumi) is a girl in the film in the class 5-1 with Goro. She initially is impressed that he plays baseball but gets mad when she finds out who his dad is. Her brother is Masato (on Goro's team), and their father is Tetsuya, a teammate of Hideki, Goro's adoptive father.
Muta
Muta is on the Mifune East team, and his number is 10. He was one of the bullies. He is lied to and called a "secret weapon" to explain why he wasn't part of the starting line-up due to his perceived lack of skill. He later pinch hits in the game against Tomonoura so he could get a chance to play.
Kuramoto
Kuramoto is on Toshi's (Tokyo Warriors) team. His number is 5.
Naruse
Naruse is the pitcher (number 1) for Tomonoura. He wears glasses, and Toshi refers to him as the ace.

Media

Manga

Major is written and illustrated by Takuya Mitsuda. The manga started in the 1994 issue #33 of Shogakukan's shōnen manga anthology Weekly Shōnen Sunday on August 3, 1994. The series finished in the 2010 issue #32 of Weekly Shōnen Sunday published on July 7, 2010. Shogakukan collected its 747 individual chapters into seventy-eight tankōbon volumes, released between January 13, 1995 and December 17, 2010. A sequel to the series entitled Major 2nd started in the 2015 issue #15 of Weekly Shōnen Sunday published on March 11, 2015.

Anime

Major has been adapted into an anime television series by Studio Hibari and later by SynergySP, titled . The series was broadcast on NHK E for 154 episodes divided in six seasons from November 13, 2004 to September 25, 2010. An animated film telling the story between the first and second seasons of the anime was released on December 13, 2008. Two OVAs were released on December 16, 2011, and January 18, 2012. The OVAs adapted the World Series chapter, which was skipped in the TV series.

Reception and legacy
As of February 2018, the Major manga had over 54 million copies in circulation. Major won the 41st Shogakukan Manga Award in the shōnen category in 1996. On TV Asahi's Manga Sōsenkyo 2021 poll, in which 150.000 people voted for their top 100 manga series, Major ranked #83.

In 2006, the anime series ranked 46th in an online poll conducted by TV Asahi on Japan's favorite animated TV series. A Celebrity List of the same poll placed the anime series at the 70th spot. In 2005, sporting goods manufacturer Mizuno entered into a one-year agreement with Shogakukan to have their company logo appear in the baseball equipment used by Goro Shigeno and other characters in the manga series. Under the agreement, Mizuno would also use the Goro Shigeno character in other promotional events. An article from The Boston Globe credits the manga series for helping increase the popularity of the gyroball pitch.

Notes

References

External links
 Major Official website by Shōnen Sunday 
 Major Official website by NHK 
 Major: Dramatic Baseball Movie Official website for the movie 
 

1994 manga
2004 anime television series debuts
2008 anime films
Anime series based on manga
Baseball in anime and manga
NHK original programming
Shogakukan manga
Shōnen manga
Studio Hibari
Xebec (studio)
Winners of the Shogakukan Manga Award for shōnen manga